is a Japanese football player who played for Blaublitz Akita.

Club statistics
Updated to 16 April 2021.

References

External links
Profile at Blaublitz Akita

1984 births
Living people
People from Akita (city)
Association football people from Akita Prefecture
Japanese footballers
Blaublitz Akita players
Akita FC Cambiare players
Association football forwards